Gervais's funnel-eared bat (Nyctiellus lepidus) is a species of bat in the family Natalidae. It is the only species within the genus Nyctiellus. It is found in Bahamas and Cuba.

Sources

Natalidae
Mammals of Cuba
Mammals described in 1837
Mammals of the Bahamas
Taxonomy articles created by Polbot
Bats of the Caribbean
Taxa named by Paul Gervais